The Ore Mountain Mining Region (officially Erzgebirge/Krušnohoří Mining Region;) is an industrial heritage landscape, over 800 years old, in the border region of the Ore Mountains between the German state of Saxony and North Bohemia in the Czech Republic. It is characterised by a plethora of historic, largely original, monuments to technology, as well as numerous individual monuments and collections related to the historic mining industry of the region. On 6 July 2019, the Erzgebirge/Krušnohoří Mining Region was inscribed as a UNESCO World Heritage Site, because of its exceptional testimony to the advancement of mining technology over the past 800 years.

Description
Because of the intensity and continuous nature of the mining in the region, the entire landscape is heavily influenced by mining, from transportation to water supply and urban planning. The region includes many well-reserved relics from derelict mines, including the mines themselves, mine shafts, smelters, and hammer mills.

The World Heritage Site comprises 22 mining sites and monuments, 17 in Germany and 5 in the Czech Republic. The list includes:
Germany
Dippoldiswalde Medieval Silver Mines
Altenberg-Zinnwald Mining Landscape
Lauenstein Administrative Centre
Freiberg Mining Landscape
Hoher Forst Mining Landscape
Schneeberg Mining Landscape
Schindlers Werk Smalt Works
Annaberg-Frohnau Mining Landscape
Pöhlberg Mining Landscape
Buchholz Mining Landscape
Marienberg Mining Town
Lauta Mining Landscape
Ehrenfriedersdorf Mining Landscape
Grünthal Silver-Copper Liquation Works
Eibenstock Mining Landscape
Rother Berg Mining Landscape
Uranium Mining Landscape

Czech Republic
Jáchymov Mining Landscape
Abertamy – Boží Dar – Horní Blatná – Mining Landscape
The Red Tower of Death in Ostrov
Krupka Mining Landscape
Mědník Hill Mining Landscape in Měděnec

History
From the first discovery of silver ore in 1168 in Christiansdorf in the territory of the present-day borough of Freiberg, which is part of the Freiberg Mining Field, mining was carried out uninterruptedly in the Ore Mountains until 1990. During that time, several different metals were extracted from the region. Silver was the first metal mined in the region (particularly around Freiberg), and the region was a world-leading producer of silver ore during the 14th through 16th centuries. On the Bohemian side of the mountains, Krupka grew into a prominent mining town, extracting silver, tin, and later iron, lead, copper, and mercury.  After the superficial deposits of silver and tin began to decline in the 16th century, the region became famous as ta world producer of cobalt, a status it maintained until the mid-18th century. Finally, anthracite and uranium were extracted in the 19th and 20th century, and were engines for the economic development of Saxony. Today deposits of indium, tungsten, tin and lithium are being investigated for their economic potential.

Gallery

References

External links

 UNESCO World Heritage Site page 
 Ore Mountain Mining Region
 Ore Mountain Mining Region 
 Erzgebirge erwartet Bekenntnis der Landesregierung zum Welterbe-Projekt Montanregion Erzgebirge (Förderverein Montanregion Erzgebirge e.V. dated 21 January 2011)
 Erzgebirge soll Unesco-Welterbe werden: Initiatoren machen Tempo, Regierung bremst (DNN-Online dated 4 April 2011)

Mining in the Ore Mountains
Industrial archaeological sites
World Heritage Sites in the Czech Republic
World Heritage Sites in Germany